

Parties represented in the Legislative Assembly

Other registered parties

Unregistered parties
 Communist Party of Canada (Marxist-Leninist), Manitoba Regional Committee

Historical parties
Canadian Party 1870
Dominion Labour Party (in Manitoba) 1918-1920
Ex-Soldiers and Ex-Sailors Party of Manitoba 1920
First Peoples Party 1995
Freedom Party of Manitoba 2007
Independent Citizen's Party 1920
Independent Labour Party (in Manitoba) (I) 1890s, 1907
Independent Labour Party (in Manitoba) (II) 1920-1943
Independent Native Voice 1995
Labor-Progressive Party 1941-1959
Labour Representation Committee (in Manitoba) 1910s
Libertarian Party of Manitoba, 1980s-2005
Manitoba Confederation of Regions Party 1984-1991
Manitoba Co-operative Commonwealth Federation 1932-1961
Manitoba First 2016-2022
Manitoba Grey Party 2002-2003
Manitoba Labour Party 1910
Manitoba Marijuana Party 2005-2007
Manitoba Party 1998-2003
Manitoba Reform Party 1991-1995
Manitoba Social Credit Party 1935-1981
Patrons of Industry 1890s
Prosperity for Posterity Party 1953
Progressive Party of Manitoba 1921-1948
Progressive Party of Manitoba (II) 1981-1995
Prohibitionists 1903
Provincial Rights Party 1882-1884
Revolutionary Workers League (in Manitoba) 1977
Social Democratic Party of Canada (in Manitoba) 1911-1920
Socialist Party of Canada (in Manitoba) 1904-1922, 1932, 1945
Sound Money Economics System 1941
Union Labour 1922
Western Canada Concept Party of Manitoba 1984-1987
Western Independence Party of Manitoba 1987-1995(?)
Winnipeg into the '90s 1989
Winnipeg Labour Party 1899-1903

See also
Elections Manitoba

 
Parties
Manitoba
Political history of Manitoba

fr:Partis politiques canadiens#Manitoba